Curt DiGiacomo (born October 24, 1963) is a former American football guard and center. He played for the San Diego Chargers in 1986 and for the Kansas City Chiefs in 1988.

References

1963 births
Living people
American football offensive guards
American football centers
Arizona Wildcats football players
San Diego Chargers players
Kansas City Chiefs players